Kipsubai Koskei (born 1 February 1951) is a Kenyan former long-distance runner. His greatest success was a 10,000 metres gold medal at the African Championships in Athletics in 1985, which he won in a championship record time of 28:11.70 minutes. He was bronze medallist in the 5000 metres that same year and returned the following year to win a silver medal in the 10,000 m.

At global level, he appeared three times at the IAAF World Cross Country Championships. He placed 15th on his debut in 1982 then went on to share in the men's team gold medals with Kenya alongside John Ngugi, Joseph Kiptum, Paul Kipkoech, Some Muge and Andrew Masai in 1986, then again in 1988 with Ngugi, Kipkoech, Kiptum, Boniface Merande and Moses Tanui. He was an individual medallist at the 1988 event and was part of a podium sweep of the men's medals behind Ngugi and Kipkoech. This was the first time this had ever happened at the competition, and one Kenyan men would repeat in 1993.

He was a four-time champion at the regional East and Central African Championships, taking his first over 1500 metres in 1977 before taking one 5000 m and two 10,000 m titles in the 1980s.

International competitions

See also
List of champions of the African Athletics Championships

References

Living people
1951 births
Kenyan male long-distance runners
Athletes (track and field) at the 1978 Commonwealth Games
Commonwealth Games competitors for Kenya